Kim Oh-Sung (born 16 August 1986) is a South Korean football midfielder who plays for Gyeongju KH&NP in the Korea National League.

Club career

Kim Oh-Sung was drafted to Daegu FC in 2009. He made his Daegu FC first-team debut on 20 June 2009 in a match against Suwon Bluewings, coming on as a substitute after 82 minutes of play. Kim made a further four K-League appearances during the season. Following limited on field play during the 2010 season (only one match), Kim joined R-League side Police FC to comply with his two-year military service obligations.

Club career statistics

External links 

1986 births
Living people
Association football midfielders
South Korean footballers
Daegu FC players
Korean Police FC (Semi-professional) players
Ulsan Hyundai Mipo Dockyard FC players
K League 1 players
Korea National League players
Korea University alumni